The 2008 Nebelhorn Trophy took place between September 25 and 29, 2008 at the Eislaufzentrum Oberstdorf. The compulsory dance was the Viennese Waltz. The competition held annually in Oberstdorf, Germany and is named after the Nebelhorn, a nearby mountain.

It is one of the first international senior competitions of the season. Skaters are entered by their respective national federations and compete in four disciplines: men's singles, ladies' singles, pair skating, and ice dance. The Fritz-Geiger-Memorial Trophy is presented to the team with the highest placements across all disciplines. In this year, it was awarded to the United States, with Canada coming in second and Germany coming in third.

Results

Men

Ladies

Pairs

Ice dance

External links

 2008 Nebelhorn Trophy

Nebelhorn Trophy
Nebelhorn
2008 in German sport